Enayetur Rahman Khan (born 28 February 1951) is a former Bangladeshi footballer who played as a striker. He served as a member of the Shadhin Bangla Football Team, the team which played across India to raise funds during the Bangladesh Liberation War in 1971, and after the war subsided he represented the Bangladesh national football team from 1973 to 1978.

He holds the record of scoring Bangladesh's first ever international goal, coming in a 2–2 draw against Thailand, during the country's inaugural competitive game, in 1973. During his playing days, Enayetur was best known for his long range shots and bad temper. He is considered to be one of the finest strikers to play the domestic football league in Bangladesh, and was seen as the country's best player alongside Kazi Salahuddin in the 1970s. Enayetur scored 90 goals in the Dhaka League during his decade long career.

Club career
Enayetur was born on February 28, 1951, in Kaliganj, Dhaka. He started his football career in 1967, playing for Fakirerpool YMC in the second division. He went onto have a short spell at East Pakistan Government Press, which was later renamed as Bangladesh Government Press after the country's independence. In 1970, Enayetur joined Victoria SC, where he scored 17 goals in his debut year. His career came to a standstill, as he had to return to Kaliganj when the 1971 Liberation War commenced. He was then selected for the Shadhin Bangla Football Team later that year. On 13 February 1972, Enayetur took part in the first football match in the newly independent Bangladesh, representing the Bangladesh XI against President XI. The Bangladesh XI was made of former members of the Shadhin Bangla Football Team, nonetheless, the experienced team ended up losing 2–0. He also played for the Dhaka XI in a 1–0 win over visiting Mohun Bagan.

After the war was over Enayetur joined BIDC, in 1972. During the 1973 league deciding match against Dhaka Wanderers Club, Enyateur struck a brace to make BIDC the first league champions in independent Bangladesh, after the previous season ended unfinished. Early on in the game BIDC had fallen 2 goals behind, Enayetur scored a knuckleball free kick past Shahidur Rahman Shantoo, who was the country's top goalkeeper at the time. He went on to score another goal, and would have had an hattrick if his third goal was not ruled out for offside. He later setup the winner scored by Wazed Gazi, as BIDC won the game 3–2. He spent the subsequent year with WAPDA before returning to BIDC who were then renamed as Bangladesh JMC (BJMC), and spent three more years at the club.

In 1978, Enayetur joined Mohammedan SC. He became the top scorer in the 1978 league with 13 goals, guiding his team to the league title. However, he did not complete his second season at the club as, Enayetur was banned for 5 years after physically attacking referee Dalil Khan during a Dhaka League game against his former club Victoria SC, in 1979. Nonetheless, the ban was later lifted by the Bangladesh Football Federation, within months. Enayetur hung up his boots while playing for Rahmatganj MFS, in 1981. Regarding his attack on the referee, Enayetur said "I have done nothing to regret. Something needed to be done on the field that day."

International career
During the start of the Bangladesh Liberation War, in 1971, Enayetur had returned to his hometown in Kaliganj as, the domestic league was postponed amidst the bloodshed. He and his teammates reached Agartala in India, while the war was ongoing. Mohammedan SC player Mohammed Kaikobad took him to Virendra Club in Agartala, where Enayetur played in the Agartala Football League. Bangladesh Sports Association officials from Kolkata came to Agartala to select the players, and Enayetur was nominated along with several others for the newly formed Shadhin Bangla Football Team. The team participated in the first match at Krishnanagar in Nadia, against the Nadia XI. The game ended in a 2–2 draw, and Enayetur scored one of the two goals for his team.

Enayetur was called up for the Bangladesh national football team squad, when they participated in the 1973 Merdeka Cup in Malaysia. Two years after independence, this was the country's first ever international tournament. On 26 July 1973, Bangladesh took on Thailand, in their first official international match. During the game, Enayetur made history by scoring Bangladesh national team's first ever goal, as the game ended 2–2. Enayetur headed the ball in after meeting a chip from winger Sunil Krishna de Chowdhury. Regarding the goal, Enayetur stated "I feel proud to be the first goal scorer of the nation. Sunil (Sunil Krishna de Chowdhury) of Cox's Bazar contributed a lot to my goal."

On 31 July 1973, Enayetur struck his second goal for his country by scoring against Kuwait, during the same Merdeka tournament. After that Enayetur was a common face in the national team, and took part in the 1975 edition of the Merdeka Cup, the 1976 Kings Cup and retired from national duty after the 1978 Asian Games, due attacking a referee in the Dhaka League.

International goals
Scores and results list Bangladesh's goal tally first.

Bangladesh

Coachig career
In 1977, Enayetur was captain cum coach of Team BJMC. After retiring Enayetur officially took up coaching as a profession, he served 8 months as coach and manager of his former club Mohammedan SC, in 1985. In 1987, he was the coach of Brothers Union.

Personal life and awards
In 1994, Enayetur left the country for the United States, and later settled in Canada with his family.

In recognition of his football career, he was awarded the Best Footballer of the Bangladesh Writers' Association in 1977 and the National Sports Award in 2004.

In November 2021, Enayetur returned to Bangladesh after 27 years abroad, in order to get his accreditation for participating in the Bangladesh Liberation War.

Playing style
Enayetur was known for his shooting abilities, and could shoot powerfully with either leg. One of his goals against Rahmatganj MFS ended up tearing the net of the goalpost. Alongside his shooting, Enayetur was renowned for his headed goals and dribbles.

Honours

BIDC
 Dhaka League = 1973

Mohammedan SC
 Dhaka League = 1978, 1980*

Individual

 Dhaka League top scorer: 1970
 Dhaka League top scorer: 1978

References

Bangladeshi footballers
Bangladesh international footballers
Bangladeshi football managers
1951 births
Living people
Footballers from Dhaka
Recipients of the Bangladesh National Sports Award
Mohammedan SC (Dhaka) players
Rahmatganj MFS players
Team BJMC players
Asian Games competitors for Bangladesh
Footballers at the 1978 Asian Games
Association football forwards